Fin Kennedy is an English playwright, teacher, and university tutor. He specialises in writing for youth and marginalised communities.

Kennedy writes for adults and teenagers and his plays are regularly produced in the UK and worldwide. He is also a teacher of playwriting and a community arts project manager, with a particular focus on young people's projects in London's East End. Occasionally, Kennedy writes about the intersection of drama, politics and society for The Guardian.

Kennedy graduated w the MA Writing for Performance programme at Goldsmiths, University of London.

In 2013 Kennedy joined Tamasha Theatre Company as co-Artistic Director.

References

External links
 About Fin Kennedy

Year of birth missing (living people)
Living people
English male dramatists and playwrights
Alumni of Goldsmiths, University of London
The Guardian people